Mary Lewis may refer to:

Arts and Entertainment
Mary Lewis (Canadian actress), Canadian actress and filmmaker from Newfoundland
Mary Lewis (soprano) (1900–1941), American soprano and actress
Mary Edmonia Lewis (1844–1907), American sculptor
Mary Jeffreys Lewis (1852–1926), British-born American actress

Government and Politics
Mary Anne Lewis, Viscountess Beaconsfield, wife of Disraeli
Mary Geiger Lewis (born 1958), United States District Judge
Mary Parker Lewis, political consultant

Science and Academics
Mary Lewis (archaeologist), professor of archaeology
Mary Butler Lewis (1903–1970), American anthropologist
Mary D. Lewis, professor of French history

See also
Lewis (surname)
Mary Jane Lewis (disambiguation), various people